Dracula inaequalis is a species of orchid.

External links

inaequalis